Antwan André Patton (born February 1, 1975), better known by his stage name Big Boi, is an American rapper, songwriter, record producer, and actor. He is best known for being a member of the southern hip hop duo Outkast alongside André 3000. Big Boi's solo debut album Sir Lucious Left Foot: The Son of Chico Dusty was released in July 2010 to critical acclaim. He released his second studio album Vicious Lies and Dangerous Rumors in 2012. Boomiverse, his third studio album, was released in June 2017.

Early life 
Patton was born and spent the first half of his childhood in Savannah, Georgia, attending Herschel V. Jenkins High School, before moving to Atlanta with his aunt Renee. He decided to pursue his interest in music at Tri-Cities High School, a visual and performing arts magnet school.

Patton credited his grandmother with getting him interested in music by sending him and his siblings to the store to buy 45 records. He further credited his uncle with introducing him to a wider variety of music, specifically Kate Bush, who he has described as his favorite artist.

Career

Outkast 
Patton met André Lauren Benjamin (stage name André 3000) while attending Tri-Cities High School. The two joined forces as Outkast in 1992 and signed with LaFace Records.

Solo career 
After four successful albums, Big Boi and André 3000 chose to make two solo albums, and release it as a double album under the Outkast name, as Speakerboxxx/The Love Below in 2003; Big Boi recorded Speakerboxxx, André 3000 recorded The Love Below. Speakerboxxx featured a style similar to Outkast's previous efforts, while The Love Below explored a more offbeat territory, with André 3000 mainly singing rather than his usual rapping.

Big Boi released two of his songs as singles. "The Way You Move", featuring Sleepy Brown, was originally supported by urban radio, but crossed over to pop charts, where it supplanted André 3000's "Hey Ya!" as the No. 1 song. The second single from Big Boi was "Ghetto Musick", which featured both members of Outkast and a sample from Patti LaBelle's "Love, Need and Want You".

In November 2005, Big Boi released a mixtape/compilation album, Got Purp? Vol 2, in conjunction with the Purple Ribbon All-Stars through Purple Ribbon Records. The first single from the album was "Kryptonite", which reached 35 on the Billboard Hot 100. Outkast was also featured on the song "International Players Anthem (I Choose You)", the first single from UGK's album Underground Kingz.

In 2007, after Idlewild, the sixth official OutKast duo album, Big Boi announced plans to release a proper solo album. Speakerboxxx had been seen by many as a solo album (and it effectively was one), but it was still released under the OutKast name, which made Sir Lucious Left Foot: The Son of Chico Dusty his first "full-fledged" solo album. The album's first promotional single, "Royal Flush", was released in 2007, and featured Raekwon and André 3000. Over the next few years the album was delayed many times, but multiple promotional and video singles were released, such as "Shine Blockas" (featuring Gucci Mane), "For Yo Sorrows" (featuring George Clinton and Too Short), and "General Patton" (featuring Big Rube). The first official single was "Shutterbugg", featuring Cutty, and the second was "Follow Us", featuring Vonnegutt. The album was formally released in July 2010. Guest artists included alternative urban singer Janelle Monáe, who went on to be a famed actor and entertainer in her own right, as well as T.I., B.o.B., and, on a hook, Big Boi's old Dungeon Family friend Khujo. Sir Lucious Left Foot: The Son of Chico Dusty was warmly received by most music critics, earning praise for its inventive sound, varied musical style, and Big Boi's lyricism.

In a July 2010 interview for The Village Voice, Big Boi revealed that he was working on the follow-up album to Sir Lucious Left Foot, entitled Vicious Lies and Dangerous Rumors, stating that he was "maybe about six songs into it". It was released on November 13, 2012. The first single from the album was "Mama Told Me" featuring Kelly Rowland. The album featured guest appearances from ASAP Rocky, Ludacris, T.I., Little Dragon, Phantogram, Kelly Rowland and B.o.B.

Later in 2012, Big Boi revealed that he had written ten songs for his third studio album. He reiterated his plans for a new studio album in January 2014. He was featured on the Catch The Throne mixtape with the song "Mother of Dragons", it was released for free download on SoundCloud by HBO on March 7, 2014, to promote the fourth season of Game of Thrones.

Big Boi had signed a management deal with Jordan Feldstein's Career Artist Management in 2014, same year inked a record deal with Epic Records.

On April 19, 2017, Big Boi revealed that his third studio album would be titled Boomiverse, and that two singles, "Mic Jack" (featuring Adam Levine) and "Kill Jill" (featuring Killer Mike and Jeezy), would be released the following day. The track "All Night" from Boomiverse was used in the 2017 Apple iPhone X commercial which saw Alana Greszata lip syncing to the song for the "Animoji yourself" feature.

In 2018, Big Boi signed to L.A. Reid and Charles Goldstuck's new label Hitco Music.

In 2019, Big Boi performed at the Super Bowl LIII halftime show. Along with other performers, he was criticized for agreeing to participate despite the U.S. national anthem protests by Colin Kaepernick and others.

In November 2021, Big Boi announced that he had recorded a song with the British singer-songwriter Kate Bush, who Big Boi has repeatedly expressed his admiration for throughout his career.

Acting 
Big Boi appeared as a guest star on seasons 3 and 5 of Nick Cannon's Wild 'n Out, as well as guest-starring and appearing as a musical guest on Chappelle's Show, performing his song "The Rooster". In 2006, he branched into feature film acting, appearing in ATL and Idlewild, followed by a starring role in 2007's Who's Your Caddy? He appeared in the Law & Order: Special Victims Unit episode "Wildlife", which aired November 18, 2008. Big Boi played hip hop artist Gots Money. Big Boi appeared in an episode of the horror anthology web television series Creepshow.

Multidisciplinary collaborations 
In 2008, Big Boi began a collaboration on a new show with the Atlanta Ballet. The show, entitled big, premiered at the Fox Theater in Atlanta, April 10–13, 2008. The show was performed by Atlanta Ballet dancers, local youth and talent, as choreographed by Lauri Stallings. Music may be performed live onstage during the performance, as it was when the ballet created a live music/dance collaboration with the Indigo Girls.

Personal life 
Big Boi and his ex-wife Sherlita have one son and one daughter; he has another son from a previous relationship. In June 2022, Big Boi divorced Sherlita Patton, officially bringing their 20 years of marriage to a close. In Patton's court filing, he stated there was "no reasonable hope of reconciliation" between Sherlita and him.   

Big Boi is a registered Pit bull and French Bulldog breeder, and owns a 40-acre ranch outside of Atlanta he calls "the Ritz Carlton for Dogs." He is also the owner of two owls named Hootie and Hoodini.

In 2009, together with Janice Faison Ahmed, Big Boi started Celebrity Trailers, an RV rental company created for professionals in the film, entertainment, and sports industries.

In August 2011, Patton was returning from a cruise when a U.S. Immigration and Customs Enforcement drug dog at the Port of Miami alerted officers. Patton was arrested and charged with illegal possession of the controlled substance MDMA (in powder form) and Viagra. Patton was released from the Miami-Dade County jail on a $16,000 bond.

In 2013, while performing at the Summer Camp Music Festival, Big Boi did an air kick onstage and hurt his knee. Doctors determined that he tore his patella and did an operation to fix his knee. After the surgery, he had to postpone several tour dates, but promised he would be performing again in six weeks.

He appeared as Mayor Atkins in the 2018 remake of the classic 1972 blaxploitation film Super Fly.

Politics and endorsements 
The City of East Point presented Antwan “Big Boi” Patton with the city's 2021 Global Icon Award and Key to the City for his contribution to the music industry and elevation of the City of East Point. 

In an interview with New York City's Hot 97, Big Boi stated that the day after the 2012 United States presidential election, a woman approached him at an airport and congratulated him on "his win last night" (referring to Barack Obama winning re-election), to which Big Boi responded, "Bitch, I voted for Gary Johnson." In a video interview with the HuffPost in January 2013, he confirmed his libertarian political ideologies.

In 2006, Big Boi founded the Big Kidz Foundation, a nonprofit organization to help youth in Atlanta. The Foundation's mission is to provide culturally-diverse experiences in the field of humanities while helping create socially-conscious youth. In January 2010, Big Boi and the executive director, Jennifer Shephard Lester, launched the Big Kidz Foundation in Savannah, Georgia. Lester also started the Rene Patton Scholarship, named after Big Boi's late aunt, and the "Saving Lives Through the Arts Campaign.""

In 2010, Big Boi launched his custom Chuck Taylor sneakers with Converse. The shoes feature the title of his Def Jam solo album debut: Sir Lucious Left Foot on the left, and Son of Chico Dusty on the right. His Big Boi logo is featured on the tongue of the shoe.

In 2015, Big Boi announced on the Rap Radar Podcast that he supported Bernie Sanders for President.

In early 2022, a new television advertisement from realtor.com featured rapper Big Boi welcoming a couple to their first “Big Boi House.” The 30-second (and 44-second) advertisements feature the Atlanta rapper accompanying a couple as they explore their new home, commenting on their “Big Boi kitchen,” “Big Boi vaulted ceilings,” and “Big Boi school district.” The advertisement is the first Big Boi has done since a 2011 NFL and Pepsi Max Commercial and is backed by his 2003 single “The Way You Move.”

Discography 

 Sir Lucious Left Foot: The Son of Chico Dusty (2010)
 Vicious Lies and Dangerous Rumors (2012)
 Boomiverse (2017)

Filmography

Film

Television

Video games

References

External links 

 
 
 

1975 births
Living people
21st-century American rappers
African-American Christians
African-American male rappers
African-American male singers
African-American record producers
American hip hop record producers
American libertarians
American male singers
Christian libertarians
Dungeon Family members
Grammy Award winners for rap music
Musicians from Savannah, Georgia
Outkast members
Purple Ribbon All-Stars members
Rappers from Atlanta
Southern hip hop musicians